Standard Liège's first game in European football came in the 1958–59 season in the European Cup against Scottish club Heart of Midlothian. Over two legs, Liège won 6–3 on aggregate. Since that time, Liège have participated in multiple European competitions. Their best success came in the 1981–82 season when they reached the final of UEFA Cup Winners' Cup to face off against Barcelona with the ending result of 2–1 loss. In 1996, they took part in the UEFA Intertoto Cup where they reached the finals to face off against Karlsruher SC of Germany. Over two legs, Liège won the first game at home 1–0. In the second game away, they lost 3–1 which was a 3–2 loss on aggregate.

European record

Matches

Notes

Summary of best results
From the quarter-finals upwards:

(2 finals)

European Cup/UEFA Champions League: 

 semi-finalists in 1962 
 quarter-finalists in 1959, 1970 and 1972 

UEFA Cup Winners' Cup (1): 

 finalists in 1982 
 semi-finalists in 1967 
 quarter-finalists in 1968 

UEFA Cup/UEFA Europa League: 

 quarter-finalists in 1981 and 2010 

UEFA Intertoto Cup (1): 

 finalists in 1996 
 semi-finalists in 2000

References

External links
Royal Standard de Liège @ UEFA.com

Standard Liège
Standard Liege
Belgian football clubs in international competitions